Anna María Baldursdóttir (born 28 August 1994) is an Icelandic football defender who plays for Stjarnan of the Úrvalsdeild. She has also played for the Iceland women's national football team.

College career
In 2015 Anna María began studying at St. John's University in New York City and playing college soccer for the "Red Storm". In a two-year stint she started 39 of her 40 appearances and scored two goals.

Club career
Anna María developed into an important defender at her first club, Stjarnan. She signed a new three-year contract in October 2018. In 2020, Stjarnan club captain Anna María missed much of the season with a torn thigh muscle but returned in September.

International career
Anna María won her first senior cap for the Iceland women's national football team on 2 March 2012, as an 86th-minute substitute for Mist Edvardsdóttir in a 4–1 defeat by Sweden at the 2012 Algarve Cup. She had been called up to the squad by coach Sigurður Ragnar Eyjólfsson as a late replacement for Sif Atladóttir, who was injured. She was named as one of eight players on standby for the Iceland squad at UEFA Women's Euro 2017.

Honours 
Stjarnan
 Úrvalsdeild (4): 2011, 2013, 2014, 2016
 Icelandic Women's Cup (3): 2012, 2014, 2015
 Icelandic League Cup A (3): 2013, 2014, 2015
 Icelandic Super Cup (2): 2012, 2015

References

External links 
 
 

Baldursdottir, Anna Maria
Baldursdottir, Anna Maria
Icelandic women's footballers
Baldursdottir, Anna Maria
Stjarnan women's football players
Úrvalsdeild kvenna (football) players
Iceland women's international footballers
Baldursdottir, Anna Maria
Icelandic expatriate footballers
Icelandic expatriate sportspeople in the United States
Baldursdottir, Anna Maria